Rappin' is a 1985 American film directed by Joel Silberg, written by Adam Friedman and Robert J. Litz, produced by Menahem Golan and Yoram Globus and starring Mario Van Peebles. The film is a sequel to Breakin' 2: Electric Boogaloo, and is also known as Breakdance 3. Although it features Ice-T (who featured in Breakin' and Breakin' 2: Electric Boogaloo), Rappin' has a plot unconnected to the previous two films and features different lead characters and locations.

Plot
Rappin' John Hood (Van Peebles), an ex-convict, attempts to save his neighborhood from developers and hoodlums. Around the same time, one of the hoodlums' girlfriend, Dixie, persuades him to audition for a rap recording contract. Their interactions develop into a relationship.

Cast
 Mario Van Peebles as John Hood 
 Rutanya Alda as Cecilia 
 Eyde Byrde as Grandma 
 Rony Clanton as Cedric
 Charles Grant as Duane
 Melvin Plowden as "Fats"
 Jessie Daniels, Antoine Lundy, Stevie D. Lundy, Charles Nelson, Trisco Pearson as The Force M.D.s
 Richie Abanes as Richie
 Harry Goz as Thorndike 
 Kadeem Hardison as "Moon"
 Eriq La Salle as "Ice"
 Leo O'Brien as Allan 
 Thomas Ross as Thomas 
 Joe Schad as Burton 
 Tasia Valenza as Dixie 
 Eugene Wilde as himself
 Richy Givens as Gangster

Production
Mario Van Peebles' raps were overdubbed by Master Gee of the Sugarhill Gang, who also wrote one part. The film was filmed in and around Pittsburgh.

Ice-T's small role is uncredited and he reportedly provided the rhymes, including the hero's climactic lines, "Can't stop / Won't stop / Climbing that mountain 'till we reach the top!"

Featured songs
 Born to love - Claudja Barry
 Rappin' – Lovebug Starski 
 Snack Attack – Melvin Plowden, Mario Van Peebles, Eriq La Salle, Kadeem Hardison, Richie Abanes 
 The Fight Rap – Lovebug Starski 
 Neighborhood Walk – Mario Van Peebles
 Itchin' For A Scratch – The Force M.D.'s 
 Flame In The Fire – Warren Mills 
 Call Me – D. Terrell 
 If You Want To (FU12) – Lajuan Carter 
 Golly Gee – Tuff, Inc. 
 First Love Never Dies – Eugene Wilde, Joanna Gardner

Reception
The film earned $2.9 million at the US box office.

References

External links
 
 New York Times review
 The AV Club review
 

1985 films
1980s hip hop films
Hood films
American crime thriller films
American sequel films
1985 thriller films
1980s musical films
Golan-Globus films
Films shot in Pittsburgh
Films set in Pennsylvania
Films set in Pittsburgh
Fictional portrayals of the Pittsburgh Bureau of Police
Films produced by Menahem Golan
Films produced by Yoram Globus
1980s English-language films
Films directed by Joel Silberg
1980s American films